In classical music, a piano quintet is a work of chamber music written for piano and four other instruments, most commonly a string quartet (i.e., two violins, viola, and cello). The term also refers to the group of musicians that plays a piano quintet. The genre particularly flourished during the nineteenth century.

Until the middle of the nineteenth century, most piano quintets were scored for piano, violin, viola, cello, and double bass. Following the success of Robert Schumann's Piano Quintet in E major, Op. 44 in 1842, which paired the piano with a string quartet, composers increasingly adopted Schumann's instrumentation, and it was this form of the piano quintet that dominated during the second half of the nineteenth century and into the twentieth century.

Among the best known and most frequently performed piano quintets, aside from Schumann's, are those by Franz Schubert, Johannes Brahms, César Franck, Antonín Dvořák and Dmitri Shostakovich.

The piano quintet before 1842
While the related chamber music genres of the piano trio and piano quartet were established in the eighteenth century by Mozart and others, the piano quintet did not come into its own as a genre until the nineteenth century. Its roots extend into the late Classical period, when piano concertos were sometimes transcribed for piano with string quartet accompaniment.

Although Luigi Boccherini composed quintets for piano and string quartet, before 1842 it was more common for the piano to be joined by violin, viola, cello and double bass.  Perhaps the best known quintets for this combination of instruments are Franz Schubert's "Trout" Quintet in A major (1819) and Johann Nepomuk Hummel's Piano Quintet in E-flat minor, Op.87 (1802). Other piano quintets using this instrumentation were composed by Jan Ladislav Dussek (1799), Ferdinand Ries (1817),  Johann Baptist Cramer (1825, 1832), Henri Jean Rigel (1826), Johann Peter Pixis (ca.1827), Franz Limmer (1832), Louise Farrenc (1839, 1840), and George Onslow (1846, 1848, 1849).

Mozart (in 1784) and Ludwig van Beethoven (in 1796) each composed a quintet for piano and winds, scored for piano, oboe, clarinet, horn, and bassoon, that are sometimes referred to as piano quintets.

Schumann and the Romantic piano quintet

In the middle of the 19th century, Robert Schumann's Piano Quintet in E major, Op. 44 (1842), composed for piano with string quartet, helped make that combination of instruments the default model for the piano quintet.  Schumann's choice of scoring reflected developments in musical performance and instrumental design.

By midcentury, the string quartet was regarded as the most prestigious and important chamber music genre, while advances in the design of the piano had expanded its power and dynamic range. Bringing the piano and string quartet together, Schumann's piano quintet took full advantage of the expressive possibilities of these forces in combination, alternating conversational passages between the five instruments with passages in which the combined forces of the strings are massed against the piano. In Schumann's hands, the piano quintet became a genre "suspended between private and public spheres" alternating between "quasi-symphonic and more properly chamber-like elements"—well suited to an era when chamber music was increasingly being performed in large concert halls rather than at private gatherings in intimate spaces.

Schumann's quintet helped establish the piano quintet as a significant, and quintessentially Romantic, chamber music genre. It was immediately acclaimed and widely imitated. Johannes Brahms, for example, was persuaded by Clara Schumann, who had played the piano part in the first public performance of her husband's piano quintet, to rework a sonata for two pianos as a piano quintet. The result, the Piano Quintet in F minor (1864), is one of the most frequently performed works of the genre.

Subsequent compositions such as César Franck's Piano Quintet in F minor (1879) and Antonín Dvořák's Piano Quintet #2 in A major, Op. 81 (1887) further solidified the genre as an archetypal "vehicle for Romantic expression."

20th century
In the twentieth century, the piano quintet repertoire was expanded with notable contributions by composers such as Béla Bartók, Sergei Taneyev, Louis Vierne, Edward Elgar, Amy Beach, Gabriel Fauré, and Dmitri Shostakovich. However, unlike the string quartet, which remained an important chamber music genre for musical experimentation, the piano quintet came to acquire "a somewhat conservative profile, far from major developments" in musical expression.

List of compositions for piano quintet
The following is a partial list of compositions for piano quintet. All works are scored for piano and string quartet unless otherwise noted.

Before 1800

Wolfgang Amadeus Mozart
Piano Quintet in E major, K. 452 (for piano, oboe, clarinet, horn, and bassoon; 1784)
Ludwig van Beethoven
Piano Quintet in E major, Op. 16 (for piano, oboe, clarinet, horn, and bassoon; 1796)
Franz Ignaz von Beecke
Piano Quintet in A minor (between 1770 and 1780)
Luigi Boccherini
Piano Quintet Op. 56 No.1 in E minor, G 407
Piano Quintet Op. 56 No.2 in F major, G 408
Piano Quintet Op. 56 No.3 in C major, G 409
Piano Quintet Op. 56 No.4 in E major, G 410
Piano Quintet Op. 56 No.5 in D major, G 411
Piano Quintet Op. 56 No.6 in A minor, G 412
Piano Quintet Op. 57 No.1 in A major, G 413

Piano Quintet Op. 57 No.2 in B major, G 414
Piano Quintet Op. 57 No.3 in E minor, G 415
Piano Quintet Op. 57 No.4 in D minor, G 416
Piano Quintet Op. 57 No.5 in E major, G 417
Piano Quintet Op. 57 No.6 in C major, G 418
Jan Ladislav Dussek
Piano Quintet in F minor, Op. 41 (for piano, violin, viola, cello, and double bass; 1799)

19th century

Alexander Alyabyev
Piano Quintet No. 1 in E major
Elfrida Andrée
Piano Quintet in E minor (1865)
Franz Berwald
Piano Quintet No. 1 in C minor (1853)
Piano Quintet No. 2 in A major (1857)
Sandro Blumenthal
Piano Quintet No. 1 in D major, Op. 2 (publ. 1900)
Piano Quintet No. 2 in G major, Op. 4 (publ. 1900)
João Domingos Bomtempo (for most of the quintets some parts are lost)
3 Piano Quintets, B67-69
3 Piano Quintets, B70-72
Piano Quintet in E major, B73
Piano Quintet in D minor, B74
Piano Quintet in E major Op. 16 (pub. 1813 or 1814)
Alexander Borodin
Piano Quintet in C minor (1862)
Johannes Brahms
Piano Quintet in F minor, Op. 34 (1864)
Max Bruch
Piano Quintet in G minor Op. Post. (1886)
Alexis Castillon de Saint-Victor
Piano Quintet in E major Op. 1 (1864)
George Whitefield Chadwick
Piano Quintet in E major (1887)
Camille Chevillard
Piano Quintet in E minor Op. 1 (1882)
Samuel Coleridge-Taylor
Piano Quintet in G minor, Op. 1 (1893)
Johann Baptist Cramer
Piano Quintet in B major, Op. 79 (for piano, violin, viola, cello, and double bass)
Carl Czerny
Variations on "Gott erhalte Franz den Kaiser", Op. 73 (1824)
Rondino on a Theme of Auber for Piano Quintet, Op. 127 (c. 1826)
Fantaisie sur themes suisses et tiroliens, Op.162 (c. 1825)
Grandes variations di bravura on 'Fra Diavolo', Op. 232 (c. 1830)
Ernő Dohnányi
Piano Quintet No. 1, Op. 1 (1895)
Piano Quintet No. 2, Op. 26 (1914)
Felix Draeseke
Piano Quintet in B major, Op. 48, (for piano, violin, viola, cello, and horn; 1888)
Antonín Dvořák
Piano Quintet No. 1 in A major, Op. 5 (1872)
Piano Quintet No. 2 in A major, Op. 81 (1887)
Louise Farrenc
Piano Quintet No. 1 in A minor, Op. 30 (for piano, violin, viola, cello, and double bass; 1839)
Piano Quintet No. 2 in E major, Op. 31 (for piano, violin, viola, cello, and double bass; 1840)
Zdeněk Fibich
Piano Quintet in D major, Op. 42, (for piano, violin, clarinet, horn, and cello 1893)
John Field
Piano Quintet in A major, H. 34  (around 1815)
Arthur Foote
Piano Quintet in A minor, Op. 38 (1897, publ. 1898)
César Franck
Piano Quintet in F minor, M. 7 (1879)
Eduard Franck
Piano Quintet in D major, op. 45 (1882)
Carl Frühling
Piano Quintet in F minor, Op. 30 (1892)
Friedrich Gernsheim
Piano Quintet no. 1 in D minor, op. 35
Piano Quintet no. 2 in B minor, op. 63, c. 1897
Hermann Goetz
Piano Quintet in C minor, Op. 16 (for piano, violin, viola, cello, and double bass; 1874)
Karl Goldmark
Piano Quintet No. 1 in B major, Op. 30 (1879)
Piano Quintet No. 2 in C minor, Op. 54 (1914?5? published 1916)
Théodore Gouvy
Piano Quintet in A major Op. 24 (1859)
Enrique Granados
Piano Quintet in G minor, Op. 49 (1894)
Emil Hartmann
Piano Quintet in G minor, Op. 5 (1865)
Peter Arnold Heise
Piano Quintet in F major (1869)
Heinrich von Herzogenberg
Piano Quintet in C major, Op. 17 (1876)
Hans Huber
Piano Quintet No.1 in G minor, Op.111 (1896)
Johann Nepomuk Hummel
Piano Quintet in E minor, Op. 87 (for piano, violin, viola, cello, and double bass; composed 1802, published 1822)
Piano Quintet in D minor, Op. 74 (transcribed for piano, violin, viola, cello, and double bass from the Op. 74 Septet; 1816)

Engelbert Humperdinck
Piano Quintet in G major (1875)
Salomon Jadassohn
Piano Quintet No. 1 in C minor, Op. 70 (1883)
Piano Quintet No. 2 in F major, Op.76 (1884)
Piano Quintet No. 3 in G minor, Op.126 (1895)
Friedrich Kiel
Piano Quintet No. 1 in A major, Op. 75 (1874)
Piano Quintet No. 2 in c minor, Op. 76 (1874)
August Klughardt
Piano quintet in G minor, Op. 43 (c. 1883)
Hans von Koessler (1853-1926)
Piano Quintet in F major
Josef Labor
Piano Quintet in E minor, Op. 3 (for piano, violin, viola, cello, and double bass, 1886)
Piano Quintet, Op. 11 (for piano, clarinet, violin, viola and cello, 1900)
Édouard Lalo
Piano quintet in A major ("Fantaisie-quintette" in 2 movements, 1862)
Franz Limmer
Piano Quintet in D minor, Op. 13 (for piano, violin, viola, cello, and double bass; c. 1830)
Giuseppe Martucci
Piano Quintet in C major, Op. 45 (1878)
Vítězslav Novák
Piano Quintet in A minor, Op. 12 (1896)
Józef Nowakowski
Piano Quintet No.1, Op.10 (1833)
Piano Quintet No.2 in E major, Op.17 (1833)
George Onslow
Piano Quintet in B minor, Op. 70 (for piano, violin, viola, cello, and double bass; 1846)
Piano Quintet in G major, Op. 76 (for piano, violin, viola, cello, and double bass; 1846)
Piano Quintet in B major, Op. 79b (1849)
Henrique Oswald
Piano Quintet in C major, Op. 18 (1895)
Ebenezer Prout
Piano Quintet in G major, Op. 3 (published 1870)
Prince Louis Ferdinand of Prussia
Piano Quintet in C minor, Op. 1 (publ. 1803)
Joachim Raff
Piano Quintet in A minor, Op. 107 (1862)
Fantasie in G minor, Op. 207b (1877)
Max Reger
Piano Quintet No. 1 in C minor (1897–98)
Piano Quintet No. 2 in C minor, Op. 64 (1901–02)
Anton Reicha
Piano Quintet in C minor (1826)
Carl Reinecke
Piano Quintet in A major, Op. 83 (by 1865)
Josef Rheinberger
Piano Quintet in C major, Op. 114 (1878)
Ferdinand Ries
Piano Quintet in B minor, Op. 74 (for piano, violin, viola, cello, and double bass; 1809)
Nicolai Rimsky-Korsakov
Quintet in B major for Piano and Winds (for piano, flute, clarinet, horn and bassoon; 1876)
Anton Rubinstein
Piano Quintet in G minor, Op. 99 (1876?) 
Camille Saint-Saëns
Piano Quintet in A minor, op. 14 (1855)
Franz Schubert
Piano Quintet in A major, D. 667 (popularly called the Trout Quintet; for piano, violin, viola, cello, and double bass; 1819)
Georg Schumann
Piano Quintet No. 1 in E minor, Op. 18 (1898)
Robert Schumann
Piano Quintet in E major, Op. 44 (1842)
Giovanni Sgambati
Piano Quintet No. 1 in F minor, Op. 4 (1866)
Piano Quintet No. 2 in B major, Op. 5
Jean Sibelius
Piano Quintet in G minor (1890)
Christian Sinding
Piano Quintet in E minor. Op. 5 (1882–84)
Louis Spohr
Piano Quintet No. 1. Op. 53
Piano Quintet No. 2, Op. 130 (1845)
Charles Villiers Stanford
Piano Quintet in D minor, Op. 25 (1886)
Josef Suk
Piano Quintet in G minor, Op. 8 (1893, rev. 1915)
Ferdinand Thieriot
Piano Quintet in D major, Op. 20 (1869, rev. 1894)
Ludwig Thuille
Piano Quintet in G minor, w/o Op. (1880)
Piano Quintet in E major, Op. 20 (1901)
Charles-Marie Widor
Piano Quintet No. 1 in D minor, Op. 7 (1868)
Piano Quintet No. 2 in D, Op. 68 (1894)
Georges Martin Witkowski
Piano Quintet in B minor (1898)
Juliusz Zarębski
Piano Quintet in G minor, Op. 34 (1885)

1900 and after

A

Rosalina Abejo
Piano Quintet (1966)
Thomas Adès
Piano Quintet (2000)
Samuel Adler
Piano Quintet (1999)
Lidia Agabalian
Piano Quintet (1955)
Miguel del Aguila
Clocks, for piano and string quartet (1998)
Charango Capriccioso, for piano and string quartet (2006)
Concierto en Tango, for piano and string quartet (2014)
 James Aikman
Piano Quintet (1997)

Eleanor Alberga
Clouds (1984)
Piano Quintet (2007)
Franco Alfano
Piano Quintet in A major (1946)
Frangiz Ali-Zadeh
Apsheron Quintet (2001)
Khazar Quintet (2006)
Anton Arensky
Piano Quintet in D major, Op. 51 (1900)
Elinor Armer
Piano Quintet (2012)
Kurt Atterberg
Piano Quintet in C major, Op. 31a (1942, adapted from Symphony No. 6 of 1928)

B

Grażyna Bacewicz
Piano Quintet No. 1 (1952)
Piano Quintet No. 2 (1965)
Maria Bach
Piano Quintet (1930)
Béla Bartók
Piano Quintet (1904)
Arnold Bax
Piano Quintet in G minor (1915)
Amy Beach
Piano Quintet in F minor, Op. 67 (1907)
Janet Beat
Concealed Imaginings for Piano Quintet (1997-1998)
Piano Quintet, The Dream Magus (2002)
Karol Beffa
Destroy (2007)
Élévation (2010)
Ma joue ennemie (2010)
Wilhelm Berger
Piano Quintet in F minor, Op. 95 (1904)

Adolphe Biarent
Piano Quintet in D minor (1912)
Ernest Bloch
Piano Quintet No. 1 (1923)
Piano Quintet No. 2 (1957)
Nancy Bloomer Deussen
Pacific City for Piano Quintet (1990).
Margaret Bonds
Piano Quintet in F major (1933)
Nimrod Borenstein
Light and darkness opus 80 (2018) 
Frank Bridge
Piano Quintet in D minor (1905, revised 1912)
Stephen Brown
Piano Quintet No. 1, Eulogy for Meghan Reid (2009)
Piano Quintet No. 2, White Light White Heat (2015)
Alan Bush
Quintet for piano and string quartet, op.104 (1985)

C–E

Charles Wakefield Cadman
Piano Quintet in G minor (1937)
Elliott Carter
Quintet for Piano and String Quartet (1997)
Quintet for Piano and Winds (1991)
Mario Castelnuovo-Tedesco
Piano Quintet No. 1 (publ. 1932)
Piano Quintet No. 2, Memories of the Tuscan Countryside, Op. 155 (1951)
Georgy Catoire
Quintet for Piano and String Quartet, Op. 28 (1914)
Jean Cras
Quintet for Piano and String Quartet in C major (1924)
Cecilia Damström
Minna – Pictures from the life of Minna Canth, Op. 53 (2017)  
Arthur Dennington
Piano Quintet (1923)

David Diamond
Quintet for Flute, Piano and String Trio (1937)
Théodore Dubois
Quintet for Piano, Violin, Oboe (or Clarinet or 2nd Violin), Viola and Cello in F major (1905)
Gabriel Dupont
Poème for Piano and String Quartet (1911)
Lucien Durosoir
Piano Quintet in F major (1925)
Katharine Emily Eggar
Piano Quintet in d minor (1906)
Eleonora Eksanishvili
Piano Quintet (1945)
Edward Elgar
Piano Quintet in A minor, Op. 84 (1918)
George Enescu
 Piano Quintet in A minor, Op. 29 (1940)

F–G

Guido Alberto Fano
Piano Quintet in C major (1917)
Arthur Farwell
Piano Quintet in e minor, Op. 103 (1937)
Gabriel Fauré
Piano Quintet No. 1 in D minor, Op. 89 (completed 1905)
Piano Quintet No. 2 in C minor, Op. 115 (completed 1921)
Morton Feldman
Piano and String Quartet (1985)
Ross Lee Finney
Two piano quintets (no. 2 written 1961)
Aloys Fleischmann
Piano Quintet (1938)
Richard Flury
Piano quintet in A minor (1948)
Jean Françaix
8 Bagatelles (1932)
Cheryl Frances-Hoad
Pay Close Attention (2009)
The Whole Earth Dances (2016) (for piano, violin, viola, cello and double-bass)
Gabriela Lena Frank
Ghosts in the Dream Machine (2005)
Tres Homenajes: Compadrazgo (2007)
Ignaz Friedman
Piano quintet in C minor (1918)

James Friskin
Piano Quintet in C minor (1907)
Phantasy for Piano Quintet (1910)
Beat Furrer
spur (1998)
Wilhelm Furtwängler
Piano Quintet in C major (completed 1935)
Vittorio Giannini
Piano Quintet (1932)
Alberto Ginastera
Piano Quintet, Op. 29 (1963)
Philip Glass
Piano Quintet (2018)
Evgeny Golubev
Piano Quintet in D minor, Op. 20 (1938)
Otar Gordeli
Piano Quintet (1950)
Konstantia Gourzi
Vibrato 1 and Vibrato 2, Op. 38 (2010)
Louis Gruenberg
Piano Quintet, Op. 13 (c. 1920)
Jorge Grundman
The Toughest Decision of God for Piano Quintet (2012)
Sofia Gubaidulina
Piano Quintet (1957)

H–K

Henry Kimball Hadley
Piano Quintet in A minor, Op.50 (1919)
Reynaldo Hahn
Piano Quintet in F minor (1922)
Marc-André Hamelin
Piano Quintet (2002 et seq.)
Roy Harris
Piano Quintet (1936)
Hamilton Harty
Piano Quintet in F major, Op. 12 (1904)
Hans Werner Henze
 Piano Quintet (1990–91)
Jennifer Higdon
Scenes from the Poet's Dreams for Piano Quintet (1999)
Alfred Hill
 Life Quintet in E major with vocal Finale (1912)
Alistair Hinton
Piano Quintet (1980–81; 2005–10)
Katherine Hoover
Piano Quintet, Op. 39, Da Pacem (1988)
Mary Howe
Piano Quintet (1928)
Hans Huber
Piano Quintet No.2 in G major, Op.125 (1907)
Jean Huré
Piano Quintet in D major (1907–08)
Vincent d'Indy
Piano Quintet in G minor, Op. 81 (1924)

Mikhail Ippolitov-Ivanov
An Evening in Georgia, Op. 71 (for piano, flute, oboe, clarinet and bassoon, 1935)
Paul Juon
No.1 in D minor, Op. 33 (1906) with 2 Violas (version with 2 violins, viola and cello Op. 33a)
No.2, Op. 44 (1909)
Robert Kahn
Piano Quintet in D major (1926) 
Shigeru Kan-no
Piano Quintet WVE-180f (2002)
Elena Kats-Chernin
The Offering (2015) 
Hugo Kaun
Piano Quintet in F minor, Op. 39 (1902)
Frida Kern
Rondino for Piano Quintet, Op. 58 (1950)
Charles Koechlin
Piano Quintet Op. 80 (1917–21)
Joonas Kokkonen
Piano Quintet (1951–53)
Erich Wolfgang Korngold
Piano Quintet in E major, Op. 15 (1921)
Anna Korsun
Isostasie for piano quintet (2011)
Lou Koster
E Summerowend / Soir d’été, Valse sérénade

L–M

Marcel Labey
Piano Quintet Op. 31 (1927–30)
László Lajtha
Piano Quintet 'Dramma per Musica', Op. 4 (1922)
Marta Lambertini
Reunión for Piano Quintet (1994)
Anne Lauber
Piano Quintet (1983)
Claude Ledoux
Piano Quintet (2005)
Paul Le Flem
Piano Quintet in E minor (1909)
Tania Léon
Ethos (2014)
Lowell Liebermann
 Quintet for Piano and Strings Op. 34 (1990)
Alessandro Longo
Piano Quintet. Op.3
Maria Teresa Luengo
Ambitos for Piano Quintet (1971)

Peter Machajdík
Abandoned Gates (Piano quintet) (2016)
Adela Maddison
Piano Quintet (1916)
Bohuslav Martinů
Piano Quintet, H. 35 (1911)
Piano Quintet No. 1, H. 229 (1933)
Piano Quintet No. 2, H. 298 (1944)
Cecilia McDowall
A Draught of Fishes (2000)
Nikolai Medtner
Piano Quintet in C major (begun 1903, finished 1949). Op. Posth.
Krzysztof Meyer
Piano Quintet Op. 76 (1991)
Darius Milhaud
Quintet No. 1 for Piano and Strings Op. 312 (1950)
Johanna Müller-Hermann
Piano Quintet in g minor, Op. 31 
Isabel Mundry
falten und fallen (for string quartet and fortepiano, 2006/7)

N–Q

Lior Navok
Piano Quintet (2000)
Dika Newlin
Piano Quintet (1941)
Tatiana Nikolayeva
Piano Quintet (1947)
Jane O'Leary
Apart/Together for piano and string quartet (2001)
Piano Quintet (2005)
Beneath the Dark Blue Waves - version for Piano Quintet (2020)
Norman O'Neill
Piano Quintet in E minor Op. 10 (1902–03)
Leo Ornstein
Piano Quintet (1927)
Joan Panetti
In a Dark Time, the Eye Begins to See for piano quintet
Hilda Paredes
Cotidales (2001)
Janet Peachey
Chaconne for Piano Quintet
Dora Pejačević
Piano Quintet in B minor Op. 40 (1918)
Barbara Pentland
Piano Quintet (1983)

Lorenzo Perosi
Piano Quintet No.1 in F major (1930-1931)
Piano Quintet No.2 in D minor (1930-1931)
Piano Quintet No.3 in A minor (1930-1931)
Piano Quintet No.4 (1930-1931)
Nikolai Peyko
Piano Quintet (1961)
Hans Pfitzner
Piano Quintet in C major, Op. 23
Mario Pilati
Piano Quintet in D major (1927–28)
Walter Piston
Piano Quintet (1949)
Tobias Picker
Nova, for piano with violin, viola, cello and bass (1979)
Piano Quintet Op. 12
Gabriel Pierné
Piano Quintet in E minor Op. 41 (1916–17)
Victoria Poleva
Simurgh-Quintet (2000)
Quincy Porter
Piano Quintet (1927)
Florence Price
Piano Quintet in e minor (1936)
Piano Quintet in a minor

...quasi una siciliana... (2009)

R

Behzad Ranjbaran
Enchanted Garden (2005) 
Alan Rawsthorne
Piano Quintet (1968)
Ottorino Respighi
Piano Quintet in F minor (1902)
Josef Rheinberger
Piano Quintet in C, Op. 114
Malcolm D Robertson
Piano Quintet (2020)
Ned Rorem
Winter Pages for clarinet, bassoon, violin, cello, and piano (1981)
Bright Music for flute, 2 violins, cello and piano (1987)
The Unquestioned Answer for flute, 2 violins, cello, and piano (2002)

George Rochberg
Electrikaleidoscope for flute, clarinet, violin, cello & piano/electric piano (1972)
Piano Quintet (1975)
Miklós Rózsa
Piano Quintet in F minor, Op. 2 (1928)
Ludomir Różycki
Piano quintet in C minor, Op. 35 (1913–16)
Elena Ruehr
The Worlds Revolve (2016)
Joseph Ryelandt
Piano Quintet in A minor, Op. 32 (1901)
Piano Quintet Op. 133 (1944)

S

Dirk Schäfer
Piano Quintet in D major, Op.5 (1901)
Philipp Scharwenka
Piano Quintet in B minor, Op. 118 (1911)
Franz Schmidt
Piano Quintet (left-hand) in G major (1926)
Florent Schmitt
Piano Quintet in B minor, Op. 51 (1908)
Alfred Schnittke
Piano Quintet (1972–76)
Georg Schumann
Piano Quintet No. 2 in F minor, Op. 49 (1909)
Cyril Scott
Piano Quintet No. 1 (1924)
Piano Quintet No. 2 (1952)
Reinhard Seehafer
 Piano Quintet (2011)
Alexander Shchetynsky
Epilogue (2008)
Dmitri Shostakovich
Piano Quintet in G minor, Op. 57 (1940)
Arlene Sierra
Harrow-lines for piano, violin, viola, cello, double bass (1999)
Albert Siklós
 Piano Quintet in C major, Op. 40 (publ. 1910)
Dave Smith
Around and about (2014)
Linda Catlin Smith
Piano Quintet (2014)

Kaikhosru Shapurji Sorabji
Piano Quintet No. 1 (1919–20)
Piano Quintet No. 2 (1932–33)
Bent Sørensen
Rosenbad – Papillons (2013) 
Ann Southam
Quintet (for string quartet and piano) (1986)
Georgia Spiropoulos
... landscapes & monstrous things ... (2016, for piano quintet, electronics and video)
Iet Stants
Piano Quintet (1921)
Carlos Stella
Hockney's Choclo: 10 variations, imitations and paraphrases on Piazzolla's arrangement of the tango 'El Choclo' after a picture by David Hockney for accordion, piano, violin, electric guitar and bass (2003)
Richard Stöhr
Piano Quintet in C minor, Op.43
Piano Quintet in G minor, Op.94 (1943)
Piano Quintet in D minor, Op.111b (1945)
Constantinos Stylianou
 Three Scenes from a Funeral (2004)
Ananda Sukarlan
 "Annanolli's Sky" for piano quintet (2017)
Edith Swepstone
Piano Quintet in f minor
Quintet in E-flat major (for piano and winds)
Jadwiga Szajna-Lewandowska
Six Pieces (for piano and string quartet) (1978)
Five Pieces for Piano Quintet (1978)

T–Z

Ellen Taaffe Zwilich
Piano Quintet (for violin, viola, cello, bass and piano, 2010) 
Germaine Tailleferre
Fantaisie sur un thème donné de Georges Caussade for Piano Quintet (1912)  
Sergei Taneyev
Piano Quintet in G minor, Op. 30 (1911)
Boris Tchaikovsky
Piano Quintet (1962)
Ernst Toch
Piano Quintet, Op. 64 (1938)
Donald Tovey
Piano Quintet in C major, Op.6 (1900)
Joan Tower
Dumbarton Quintet for Piano Quintet (2008)
Joaquín Turina
Piano Quintet in G minor, Op. 1 (1907)
Stefania Turkewich
Piano Quintet (1960s)
Mark-Anthony Turnage
Slide Stride (2002)
Ralph Vaughan Williams
Piano Quintet in C Minor (piano, violin, viola, cello & double bass) (1903)
Oscar Vermeire
Quintette symphonique in B minor, Op. 25 (1910)
Louis Vierne
Piano Quintet in C minor, Op. 42 (1917)
Alba Rosa Viëtor
Quintetto in La Minore (1940)
Julian Wagstaff
Piano Quintet (2002)
Errollyn Wallen
Music for Tigers (2006)

Graham Waterhouse
Rhapsodie Macabre (2011)
Anton Webern
Piano Quintet (1907)
Douglas Weiland
Piano Quintet, Op. 8 (1988)
Mieczysław Weinberg [Моисей Самуилович Вайнберг]
Piano Quintet in F minor, Op. 18 (1944)
Grace Williams
Phantasy Quintet (for piano and strings) (1928)
William G. Whittaker
 Among the Northumbrian Hills (1922)
Ermanno Wolf-Ferrari
Piano Quintet in D major, Op.6 (1901)
Margot Wright
Piano Quintet in d minor (1932)
Charles Wuorinen
Piano Quintet (1994)
Second Piano Quintet (2008)
Iannis Xenakis
Akea {Άκεα} (1986)
Yitzhak Yedid
Piano Quintet 'Since My Soul Loved', (2006)
Piano Quintet Enrique Granados A la Cubana Op.36
Seung Ha You
Quintet for piano and strings op.1 (2007–2011)
Théo Ysaÿe
Piano quintet in B minor, Op. 5 (before 1918)
Hermann Zilcher
Piano Quintet in C♯ minor, Op. 42 (1918)

See also
 Quintet

References

Further reading
Basil Smallman (1994). The Piano Quartet and Quintet: Style Structure, and Scoring, New York: Oxford University Press. .

External links
Public domain piano quintet scores from IMSLP

Chamber music
 
Piano
Types of musical groups